The Yilan County Government is the local government of  Yilan County, Taiwan.

Yilan County Hall is located in Yilan City, adjacent to Yilan County Council building, Local Court and District Attorney's Office.

Organizational structure

First class units
 Finance Department
 Business and Tourism Department
 Economic Affairs Department
 Public Works Department
 Education Department
 Agriculture Department
 Social Affairs Department
 Land Administration Department
 Secretariat
 Planning Department
 Civil Affairs Department
 Budget, Accounting and Statistic Department
 Personnel Department
 Civil Service Ethics Department
 Labor Affairs Department

First organs
 Cultural Affairs Bureau
 Environmental Protection Bureau
 Public Health Bureau
 Local Tax Bureau
 Fire Bureau
 Police Bureau

Second organs
 Family Education Center
 Yilan County Stadium
 Yilan County Animal and Plant Disease Control Center
 Luodong Land Office
 Yilan Land Office
 Mortuary Services Office
 Yilan Household Registration Office
 Loudong Household Registration Office
 Toucheng Household Registration Office
 Su'ao Household Registration Office
 Yuanshan Household Registration Office
 Jhuangwei Household Registration Office
 Dongshan Household Registration Office
 Wujie Household Registration Office
 Datong Household Registration Office
 Nan'ao Household Registration Office
 Jiaoxi Household Registration Office
 Sansing Household Registration Office
 Yilan County Indigenous Peoples Office

Access
The county hall is accessible south of Yilan Station of Taiwan Railways.

References

External links

 

Local governments of the Republic of China
Yilan County, Taiwan